The Sheshma (Çişmä) is a river in Tatarstan and Samara Oblast, Russian Federation, a left tributary of the Kama, falling into the Kama near Starosheshminsk.

Major tributaries are the Forest Sheshma, Kuvak, Sekines, Kichuy, and Talkysh rivers. The river generally is fed by underground water in the dry season. Drainage is regulated. There are major flood-plains in the middle and lower reaches of the Sheshma. Since 1978 it has been protected as a natural monument of Tatarstan. Shugurovo, Novosheshminsk and Starosheshminsk stay on the river.

References 

Rivers of Tatarstan
Rivers of Samara Oblast